İnşaatçı Sabirabad FK was an Azerbaijani football club from Sabirabad founded in 1989, as Stroitel Sabirabad, changing their name to İnşaatçı Baku in 1992 before dissolving in 1995.

They won the Soviet Second League B Zone III championship in 1989 and the cup in 1986.

They participated in the Azerbaijan Top Division in 1992 and 1993, finishing 8th in their first season and 14th in their second. They were also runner-up in the 1993 Azerbaijan Cup.

League and domestic cup history

References 

Insaatci Sabirabad
Association football clubs established in 1989
Defunct football clubs in Azerbaijan